The 2018 United States House of Representatives election in the Northern Mariana Islands was held on Tuesday, November 13, 2018, to elect the territory's Delegate to the United States House of Representatives in the 116th United States Congress. Delegate Gregorio Sablan was re-elected to his sixth term as Delegate to the U.S. House of Representatives
from the Northern Mariana Islands' at-large district.

The election was originally scheduled for Tuesday, November 6, 2018, to coincide with the 2018 House of Representatives election and the Northern Mariana Islands (CNMI) territorial elections. However, all 2018 elections in the CNMI were postponed until November 13, 2018, due to the impact of Typhoon Yutu, which devastated the Northern Mariana Islands as a Category 5-equivalent super typhoon on October 24, just weeks before the election.

The Northern Mariana Islands' non-voting delegate to the U.S. House of Representatives is elected for a two-year term. Incumbent Delegate Gregorio Sablan, an independent who caucuses with the Democratic Party, successfully sought re-election to a sixth consecutive term.  Sablan, who ran unopposed in 2016, defeated Republican Rep. Angel Demapan, a member of the Northern Mariana Islands House of Representatives.

The election coincided with the elections of other federal midterm and Commonwealth offices, including the local Northern Mariana Islands general election and territorial general election, as well as the nationwide 2018 United States House of Representatives elections and the 2016 United States general elections.

Candidates

Independent 
Gregorio Sablan, incumbent Delegate for Northern Mariana Islands' at-large congressional district since January 2009

Republican 
Angel Demapan, member of the Northern Mariana Islands House of Representatives since January 12, 2015. First elected to the Northern Mariana Islands House of Representatives in the 2014 general election.

Results 
Incumbent Gregorio Sablan won re-election to his sixth term as Delegate, defeating Republican Angel Demapan.

References

External links 
Gregorio Kilili Camacho Sablan for U.S. Congress 2018
Angel Demapan for U.S. Congress

Northern Mariana Islands
2018
United States House of Representatives elections